Pirionimyia is a genus of parasitic flies in the family Tachinidae.

Species
Pirionimyia paradoxa Townsend, 1931

References

Dexiinae
Diptera of Africa
Monotypic Brachycera genera
Taxa named by Charles Henry Tyler Townsend
Tachinidae genera